Sadique Baba Abubakar   (born 8 April 1960) is a retired air marshal in the Nigerian Air Force and former Chief of Air Staff. He served as Chief of Air Staff from 12 July 2015 to 26 January 2021.

Background and education
Sadique Baba Abubakar was born on 8 April 1960, in Azare, Bauchi State. He had his primary education at St Paul's Primary School Bauchi  from 1967 to 1973 and for his secondary education, he attended Government Secondary School, Bauchi. Abubakar joined the Nigerian Air Force as a member of Cadet Military Training Course (CMTC 5) in November 1979.

Abubakar has a Diploma in Public Administration and a Bachelor of Science degree (second class upper division) in political science. He also holds a Master of Science Degree in Strategic Studies from University of Ibadan. Abubakar has a Commercial Pilot License (CPL) Helicopters with Instrument Rating and has flown a total of seven aircraft types: Bulldog, Piper Warrior, Enstrom, Bell 206, BO-105, Mi-35P and Mi- 17.

Career
Abubakar's previous appointments include Chief of Standards and Evaluation, NAF Headquarters, Chief of Defence Communications and Air Officer Commanding, NAF Training Command. He served as Chief of Administration, NAF Headquarters prior to his appointment as Chief of Air Staff.

Achievement In office 
Air Marshal Sadique Baba Abubakar has transformed the NAF into a highly professional and well-motivated force for effective and timely employment of air power. To this end, he has expanded the NAF structure by establishing the Special Operations Command and specialized units under the command as well as the unbundling the Training Command into Air Training Command and Ground Training Command. This has positioned the NAF to effectively tackle contemporary security challenges and national defence imperatives. 
Under his leadership as the Chief of the Air Staff, he has enhanced welfare of personnel through the increment of infrastructure with the execution of 1,003 projects including the upgrade of housing, schools and hospitals. These efforts has led to accommodation for over 8,763 families amongst others. The last five and half years of his administration has also witnessed an unprecedented increase in the number of aircraft availability. A total of 49 platforms have been acquired with 23 inducted into the service, while the Service is awaiting the delivery of others such as the Super Tucano from USA as well as the JF-17 from Pakistan.  The last time such unprecedented number of platforms were inducted into the Service was in the 1980’s. The NAF has also reactivated 31 aircraft types with 10 of the aircraft types reactivated in-country. The NAF has also trained and winged 118 pilots in the last 5 and half years out of which 13 are females. Of note is the recent ab-initio pilot training in a record time of 4 months, a feat last recorded about 3 decades ago. Suffice it to say, it is the first time in decades that the NAF officer cadets would complete ab- initio training prior to commissioning from NDA.  Additionally, the Service has conducted training for its personnel in a total of 28,647 training slots, in 264 different courses both within and outside the country. These courses/trainings range from flying, administration, ICT, engineering and base defence. 
As expected, the operational outcome of all these efforts have been significant. Specifically, the Nigerian Air Force under the leadership of Air Marshal Abubakar was able to decimate the capabilities of the Boko Haram terrorists in the North East through the effective deployment of platforms as well as the prudent and efficient utilization of human resources. Likewise, the NAF has helped in curtailing the activities of armed bandits, militants groups as well as cattle rustlers across the country. Furthermore, the fight against armed bandits and cattle rustlers in the North West has yielded the desired positive results.  Additionally, the NAF under Air Marshal Abubakar was unprecedented as exemplified by:
Establishment of two level 2 hospitals in Bama and Dalori IDP Camps in Borno.
The initiation of a feeding programme for 1000 school children in the two IDP Camps.
Conducted 66 Medical outreaches with over 421,032 beneficiaries across the country in the last five and half years.
Conducted 3,181 eye and general surgeries from July 2015 to January 2021.

Training
 Directing Staff, Junior Division Armed Forces Command and Staff College. 

  Staff, Senior Division Armed Forces Command and Staff College. 

 Directing Staff, National Defence College. 

 External Examiner at the National Defence College. 

 Chairman, Participant’s Project Defence

Awards And Decorated
In October 2022, a Nigerian national honour of Commander of the Order of the Federal Republic (CFR) was conferred on him by President Muhammadu Buhari.
 Best Cadet in Flying at Primary Flying Training Wing in 1981. 
 Best All Round Cadet at Primary Flying Training Wing in 1981. 
 Tactical Air Command Best Officer of the Year in 1997. 
 Chief of the Air Staff’s Letter of Commendation for good leadership and prudent management of resources by Air Marshal OO Petinrin in 2009. 
 Chief of the Air Staff’s Letter of Commendation for good leadership and prudent management of resources by Air Marshal MD Umar in 2011. 
 Chief of the Air Staff’s Special Award from Air Marshal AS Badeh in 2013. 
 Distinguished Flying Star (DFS). 
 General Service Star (GSS). 
 Passed Staff Course ‘Dagger’ psc(+). 
 Distinguished Fellow of the National Defence College fdc(+). 
 Distinguished Alumni of National Defence College. 
 Distinguished Alumnus Ibadan Strategic Studies.
 Fellow Society for Peace Studies and Practice (Uni Ibadan).

References

Living people
People from Bauchi State
Nigerian Air Force air marshals
Nigerian Air Force officers
University of Ibadan alumni
Commercial aviators
1960 births